The 2005 J&S Cup was a Tier II event on the 2005 WTA Tour that run from April 25 - May 1, 2005. It was held in Warsaw, Poland, and was the 10th year that the event was staged. Justine Henin-Hardenne won her first Warsaw title and second overall of the year.

Entrants

Seeds

 Seedings are based on the rankings of April 18, 2005.
 Amélie Mauresmo withdrew From the tournament, so Francesca Schiavone became the No. 9 seed.

Other entrants
The following players received wildcards into the main draw:

  Marta Domachowska
  Karolina Kosińska

The following players received entry from the qualifying draw:

  Anna Chakvetadze
  Maria Kirilenko
  Zuzana Ondrášková
  Julia Vakulenko

The following players received entry as lucky losers:

  Denisa Chládková
  Michaela Paštiková
  Tatiana Perebiynis

Finals

Singles

 Justine Henin-Hardenne defeated  Svetlana Kuznetsova, 3–6, 6–2, 7–5

Doubles

 Tatiana Perebiynis /  Barbora Strýcová defeated  Klaudia Jans /  Alicja Rosolska, 6–1, 6–4

External links
WTA Profile

JandS Cup
Warsaw Open
War